Estádio Municipal Prof. Luís Augusto de Oliveira, usually known as Estádio Luisão, or just  O Luisão, is a football (soccer) stadium in São Carlos, São Paulo, Brazil. The stadium has a maximum capacity of 14,359. It was inaugurated on November 3, 1968. The stadium is owned by the São Carlos City Hall, and its formal name honors Luís Augusto de Oliveira (b. 5 December 1900, d. 14 July 1956), who was the mayor of São Carlos. Luisão means Luisão (Big Louis, in English).

History 
The inaugural match was played on November 3, 1968, when amateur Seleção Amadora A and B of São Carlos beat AA Itapuí 5–0,  and São Paulo FC beat SE Palmeiras 3–2. The first goal of the stadium was scored by Talin (amateur) Seleção Amadora A and B of São Carlos, and by Antoninho (professional) (São Paulo FC).

The stadium's attendance record currently stands at 23,712 people, set on June 24, 1979 when Corinthians beat GE Sãocarlense 6–2.

On September 7, 1976, the stadium lighting was inaugurated. GE Sãocarlense beat Ferroviária 1–0 in the lighting inaugural match.

References 

Enciclopédia do Futebol Brasileiro, Volume 3 - Lance, Rio de Janeiro: Aretê Editorial S/A, 2001.

External links 
 Word stadium
 Templos do futebol
 Image Google maps

Sports venues in São Paulo (state)
São Carlos
Football venues in São Paulo (state)